Caroline Waterlow is an American producer, best known for producing the documentary film O.J.: Made in America ESPN's 30 for 30. Waterlow won the Academy Award for Best Documentary Feature at the 89th Academy Awards, together with director Ezra Edelman.

Filmography
 O.J.: Made in America
 Makers: Women Who Make America 
 Supermensch: The Legend of Shep Gordon
 Cutie and the Boxer
 Brooklyn Dodgers: The Ghosts of Flatbush
 American Experience
 History Rocks
 The American President

Awards and nominations

References

External links
 

Living people
American producers
Year of birth missing (living people)